The Greatest Generation is a 1998 book by journalist Tom Brokaw that profiles those who grew up in the United States during the deprivation of the Great Depression and then went on to fight in World War II as well as those whose productivity within the home front during World War II made a decisive material contribution to the war effort. The book popularized the term Greatest Generation for the name of the cultural generation before the Silent Generation.

Summary
Brokaw profiles those who came of age during World War II in the United States, stemming from his attendance at the D-Day 40th anniversary celebrations. In the book, Brokaw wrote that "it is, I believe, the greatest generation any society has ever produced." He argued that these men and women fought not for fame and recognition, but because it was the "right thing to do."

See also
Military history of the United States during World War II
United States home front during World War II

References

Sources
The Greatest Generation by Tom Brokaw (1998)  (hardback)  (paperback), depicts the Americans who came of age during the Great Depression and fought World War II.
The Greatest Generation Speaks by Tom Brokaw (1999)  (hardback)  (paperback)
The Great Boom 1950–2000: How a Generation of Americans Created the World's Most Prosperous Society by Robert Sobel (2000) 
Generations: The History of America's Future, 1584 to 2069 by Strauss and Howe (1991)

External links
Presentation by Brokaw on The Greatest Generation, December 7, 1998, C-SPAN
Booknotes interview with Tom Brokaw on The Greatest Generation, March 7, 1999, C-SPAN
Amazon.com's book reviews and description 
OnTheIssues.org's book review and excerpts
One last time they gather, the Greatest Generation

1998 non-fiction books
20th-century history books
American history books
History books about the United States
History books about World War II
Non-fiction books about the Great Depression
Random House books
Sociology books